Agmon is a Jewish surname, Hebrew for bulrush. Notable people with the surname include:

 Avraham Agmon (born 1928), Polish-Israeli diplomat and economist 
 David Agmon (born 1947), Israeli general
 Nathan Agmon (born 1896), Ukrainian-Israeli writer and translator
 Shmuel Agmon (born 1922), Israeli mathematician
 Yaakov Agmon (born 1929), Israeli theatre producer

References 

Jewish surnames
Hebrew-language surnames